FC Rodina-M Moscow is a Russian football team based in Moscow. It was founded in 2022. It is a farm club for FC Rodina Moscow.

Club history
Moscow-based club FC Rodina Moscow was promoted to the second-tier Russian First League for the 2022–23 season. Following that, Rodina received a professional license for the 2022–23 season of the Russian Second League for its two farm-teams, FC Rodina-M Moscow and Rodina-2.

Current squad
As of 22 February 2023, according to the Second League website.

References

Association football clubs established in 2022
Football clubs in Russia
Football clubs in Moscow
2022 establishments in Russia